Marcus Wilson (born 1932) is an Irish retired Gaelic footballer who played for club side St. Vincent's and at inter-county level with the Dublin senior football and hurling teams.

Career

A member of the St. Vincent's club, Wilson first came to prominence with the Dublin senior football team during their 1952-53 National League success. It was the first of two National League title success. Wilson later won a Leinster Championship medal and lined out at full-back for Dublin's 1958 All-Ireland final defeat of Derry.

Honours

Dublin
All-Ireland Senior Football Championship: 1958
Leinster Senior Football Championship: 1958
National Football League: 1952-53, 1957-58

References

1930 births
Living people
St Vincents (Dublin) Gaelic footballers
Dublin inter-county Gaelic footballers